Moraro is a comune (municipality) in  the Italian region Friuli-Venezia Giulia, located about  northwest of Trieste and about  west of Gorizia.

Moraro borders the following municipalities: Capriva del Friuli, Cormons, Farra d'Isonzo, Gradisca d'Isonzo, Mariano del Friuli, San Lorenzo Isontino.

References

Cities and towns in Friuli-Venezia Giulia